Sadeyreh may refer to:
 Sadeyreh-ye Olya
 Sadeyreh-ye Sofla